Ēosturmōnaþ (modern English: Ēostre's month) was the Anglo-Saxon name for the month of April.

The name was recorded by the Anglo-Saxon scholar Bede in his treatise De temporum ratione (The Reckoning of  Time), saying "Eostur-Monath, which we now interpret as the Easter month, comes from [the goddess] Eostre. We now call the Paschal season by her name, thereby referring to the joys of the new festival with the ancient designation."

See also

Germanic calendar
Anglo-Saxon
Old English

References

April
Old English